Ljutic may refer to:

 Al Ljutic (before 1930 - after 1964), American heavyweight boxer, competitive rifle shooter, and gun maker
 Ljutic Industries, an American manufacturer of shotguns founded by Al Ljutic
 Ljutic Space Gun, a 12 gauge single-shot shotgun designed by Al Ljutic

See also
 Ljutice (disambiguation)